Salvatore Nuvoli (23 March 1935 – 28 October 2010) was an Italian rower. He competed in the men's eight event at the 1956 Summer Olympics.

References

External links
 

1935 births
2010 deaths
Italian male rowers
Olympic rowers of Italy
Rowers at the 1956 Summer Olympics